Shyama may refer to:

 Shyama (Hindi actress) (1935–2017), Indian actress in Hindi films
 Shyama (Malayalam actress) (?–1996), Indian actress in Malayalam and Tamil films
 Shyama (Jain monk) ( 247 BC–151 BC), Jain monk
 Shama Dulari ( 1940s–1950s), often confused with the above Hindi actress 
 Shyama (film), a 1986 Malayalam film
 Kali Shyama (Hindu Deity). "Shyama Kali has a somewhat tender aspect and is worshipped in the Hindu Households. She is the dispenser of boons and the dispeller of fear." [Source: Harding, E. Kali. 1993.]